Général Bonaparte was a  passenger ship that was built in 1922 by Chantiers & Ateliers de Provence for the Compagnie Marseillaise de Navires à Vapeur.

Description
The ship was powered by a four-cylinder triple-expansion steam engine. There were two cylinders of the largest diameter. The engine was built by Chantiers & Ateliers de Provence. It was rated at 484NHP.

History
Général Bonaparte was built in 1922 by Chantiers & Ateliers de Provence, Port-de-Bouc, Bouches-du-Rhône, France for the Compagnie Marseillaise de Navires à Vapeur. She was launched on 1 January 1923. The ship was operated under the management of the Compagnie de Navigation Fraissinet. Her port of registry was Marseille and the Code Letters OVSM were allocated. In 1934, her Code Letters were changed to LOGW.

On 23 October 1937 whilst on board Général Bonaparte, César Campinchi, the Minister of Marine, remarked that he thought war with Italy was "not only inevitable but necessary". He also said that new air bases would need to be established in Corsica, from which an offensive would be launched that would "bring Fascism to its knees". The Italian press were reported to have reacted "violently" to these remarks, although there were not official protests from the Italian Government.

She was on a voyage from Ajaccio, Corsica to Nice. There were 68 crew and 199 passengers on board.

References

External links
Report of the loss of Général Bonaparte in La Jeune Corse newspaper 
Newspaper account of the loss of Général Bonaparte by a survivor 
Photo of Général Bonaparte

1923 ships
Ships built in France
Passenger ships of France
World War II merchant ships of France
Maritime incidents in May 1943
Ships sunk by British submarines
World War II shipwrecks in the Mediterranean Sea